The Civil Code of Lower Canada was a set of laws that were in effect in Lower Canada on 1 August 1866 and remained in effect in Quebec until repealed and replaced by the Civil Code of Quebec on 1 January 1994. The Code replaced a mixture of French law and English law that had arisen in Lower Canada since the creation of the Province of Quebec in 1763.

Before the Code

French colonial era

From 1608 to 1664, the first colonists of New France followed the customary law in effect for their province of origin in France. In 1664, the King of France decreed in Article 33 of the decree establishing the French West India Company that the Custom of Paris would serve as the main source of law throughout New France.  Later, authorities went on to add le droit français de la métropole, that is, French law.  This included royal decrees and ordinances (ordonnances royales), canon law relating to marriages, and Roman law relating to obligations, e.g., contracts and torts. Also in force were the ordinances issued by Royal Intendants (ordonnances des intendants) and the orders and judgments handed down by the Conseil supérieur.

The Royal Intendant was responsible for administering justice in the colony, and lawyers were barred from practicing in the colony.  Most disputes were resolved by local notaries or local parish priests through arbitration in a manner much as had been done in ancient Rome.  While the reliance on feudal French law meant that New France was divided into fiefs (seigneuries), the manorial lords (or seigneurs) were not entitled to the same judicial discretion in New France as they had in France; as it was, all criminal jurisdiction went to the Intendant. Therefore, while the Custom of Paris was the law of New France, there were few resources available for colonists to actually enforce that law.

Under the British Empire

Following France's relinquishment of Canada in favour of Guadeloupe in the Treaty of Paris, Canada came under British law.   However, the seigneurial system of land tenure continued to be applied uniformly throughout the province.  In 1774, as a result of a ruling by the British courts in Campbell v Hall about the status of legal systems found in acquired territories, the British Parliament passed the Quebec Act, which preserved French civil law for private law while keeping and reserving English common law for public law including criminal prosecution.  As a result, modern-day Quebec is now one of only a handful of bijuridical jurisdictions in the world where two legal systems co-exist.

The Quebec Act was opposed by the English minority who believed that British citizens should be governed by English law.  The Constitutional Act of 1791 resolved the dispute through the creation of Upper Canada west of the Ottawa River (subject to English common law) and Lower Canada around the St. Lawrence River (where civil law was maintained).

The need for codification

The practice of civil law in Lower Canada became quite complex by the middle of the 19th century, because of the multiple sources of law that needed to be drawn upon  most only available in French. As identified by René-Édouard Caron, the "law of the land" included:

the Custom of Paris as it was in 1663
during 16631759, edicts and ordinances of the French Crown that applied to Canada
during 16631759, ordinances of the Conseil supérieur
laws, edicts and ordinances issued by the French Crown for France that were registered with the Conseil supérieur
statutes of the British Parliament passed since the Conquest for Canada, or which specifically named Canada
during 17591764, laws passed by the British military government prior to the Treaty of Paris
during 17641791, laws passed by the Legislative Council of Quebec
Provincial Statutes of Lower Canada, 17911840
Ordinances of the Special Council of Lower Canada, 18381841
from 1840, Acts passed by the Parliament of the Province of Canada applicable to Lower Canada
English criminal laws as they existed at the passage of the Quebec Act 1774 as amended
for matters not treated in the above categories:
 pre-revolutionary French legal writers, such as Robert Joseph Pothier, Jean Domat, and Angers
 Canadian legal writers, such as Doucet, Crémazie, Louis-Hippolyte LaFontaine, and Bonner
 case law incorporating French case law and judgments published in Canadian law reports
 English public law applicable throughout the British Empire affecting the rights of British subjects

In 1859, Désiré Girouard (later a judge of the Supreme Court of Canada) noted:

Creation

In 1857, the Legislative Assembly of the Province of Canada passed An Act respecting the Codification of the Laws of Lower Canada relative to Civil matters and Procedure, to authorize the codification of the civil law then currently in force in Lower Canada. The Act's preamble declared:

The Act authorized the creation of a codification commission, which consisted of three commissioners and two secretaries, all drawn from the Bar of Lower Canada.

The Act authorizing the Code's adoption received royal assent on 18 September 1865, and it was proclaimed in force on 1 August 1866.

The commission was also charged with the codification of the laws of civil procedure, and the Act authorizing the adoption of the Code of Civil Procedure of Lower Canada received royal assent on 15 August 1866, and came into force on 28 June 1867.

The Code was generally greeted with satisfaction. As Thomas McCord noted in his 1867 edition of the Code:

Layout

The Code consisted of four books:

 Book First – Of Persons (consisting of eleven titles)
 Book Second – Of Property, Of Ownership, and of its different modifications (consisting of five titles)
 Book Third – Of the Acquisition and Exercise of rights of property (consisting of twenty titles)
 Book Fourth – Commercial Law (consisting of six titles)

The provisions of the Code were drawn from several sources, including:

 the Napoleonic Code of 1804
 the Louisiana Civil Code of 1825
 the writings of Robert Joseph Pothier on pre-revolutionary French jurisprudence
 writings of contemporary commentators regarding the Napoleonic Code
 the Field Code movement in New York
 the Civil Code of the Canton de Vaud of 1819

The codification resulted in many parts of the French civil law being available in English for the first time. As Thomas McCord related later:

Innovation

While the 1804 French Civil Code's framework was used in drafting the CCLC, the commissioners had to adapt its provisions to conform to the legal situation in Lower Canada by:

 deleting those provisions that were "new" law and thus not in force in Lower Canada
 adding to the Code those laws particular to Lower Canada

In addition, they proposed 217 resolutions for changes to the law, which were accepted by the Legislature with only minor modifications. As Thomas-Jean-Jacques Loranger observed in his 1873 work, Commentaire sur le Code Civil du Bas-Canada:

There were significant reforms to the previous French law:

 mutual assent alone was now sufficient to convey title without delivery (which also was extended to cover sales and gifts)
 lesion (i.e. injury from another's failure to perform a contract) was abolished as grounds for voiding contracts between adults
 in contractual obligations, any stipulation of a fixed and certain sum to be paid as damages would no longer be liable to modification by the courts

Unlike the 1804 French Civil Code, with its revolutionary ideals, the Civil Code of Lower Canada reflected the conservative, family-oriented values of the largely rural (and mostly francophone) society of 19th-century Quebec, as well as the economic liberalism of the burgeoning commercial and industrial (and primarily anglophone) élites concentrated in Montreal. In structure and style, the Code reflected the 1804 French Code very closely. Nevertheless, it rejected major elements of the French Code which were new law (since 1763 or 1789) and socially unacceptable to most Québécois (notably divorce), while maintaining elements of the pre-revolutionary French law (e.g. the fideicommissary substitution).

Although most of the original draft of the code was done in French (subsequently translated into English), all of Book Fourth and most of Book Third were originally drafted in English. In order to deal with any potential conflicts between the French and English texts, Article 2615 of the Code stated:

In 1922, Francis Alexander Anglin, in addressing the Junior Bar of Quebec on the impact of the Code, observed:

Replacement

From 1888 to 1979, the Code was amended to reflect the various social and commercial changes occurring within Quebec society. In 1890, the Parliament of Canada ousted articles 22792354 of the Code with the passage of the Bills of Exchange Act.

Work commenced in 1955 on the revision of the Civil Code of Lower Canada, which eventually led to the passing of a new civil code by the National Assembly of Quebec on 8 December 1991, which came into force as the Civil Code of Quebec on 1 January 1994.

The repeal of the CCLC did not affect those provisions that affected areas within federal jurisdiction, which continued to be in force in Quebec (insofar as they had not been displaced by other federal Acts) until they were finally repealed by the Parliament of Canada on 1 June 2001. The same legislation also provided framework provisions relating to marriage in the Province, that were "to be interpreted as though they formed part of the Civil Code of Québec."

Notes and references

Notes

References

Bibliography

 
 
 Charles Chamilly de Lorimier et Charles Albert Vilbon, La bibliothèque du Code civil de la province de Québec (1885), Cadieux & Derome 
 Pierre-Basile Mignault, Le Droit civil canadien basé sur les « Répétitions écrites sur le code civil » de Frédéric Mourlon avec revue de la jurisprudence de nos tribunaux par P.B. Mignault, conseil de la reine, Whiteford & Théoret, éditeurs (volume 1, 1895), C. Théoret, éditeur (volumes 26, 18961902), Wilson & Lafleur, éditeurs (volumes 79, 19061916), Montréal.

External links
 
 

Province of Canada legislation
Quebec provincial legislation
Civil codes
1865 in Canada
1865 in Canadian law
Repealed Canadian legislation